Chris Malachowsky (born May 2, 1959) is an American electrical engineer, one of the co-founders of computer graphics company Nvidia.

Raised in the Oakhurst section of Ocean Township, Monmouth County, New Jersey, Malachowsky graduated from Ocean Township High School in 1976. He received a B.S. degree in 1983, in electrical engineering from the University of Florida and an M.S. degree in 1986 from Santa Clara University. In 2008, he received the Distinguished Alumni Award from Santa Clara University and received Distinguished Alumni Award from University of Florida College of Engineering in 2017.

Early in his career, he worked for Hewlett-Packard and Sun Microsystems. He co-founded Nvidia in April 1993 with Curtis Priem and Jen-Hsun Huang and is a Senior Vice President for Engineering and Operations.

References

Nvidia people
University of Florida College of Engineering alumni
Santa Clara University alumni
Living people
American technology company founders
Corporate executives
Ocean Township High School alumni
People from Ocean Township, Monmouth County, New Jersey
Engineers from New Jersey
1959 births